Michael Andreas Mellinger (30 May 1929 – 17 March 2004) was a German actor in film, television, theatre and radio. He was best known for his appearances on the West End and supporting role in the film Goldfinger (1964).

Biography
Born in Kochel, Bavaria, Mellinger came from a theatrical background; both his parents were actors. He was sent to boarding school in England, and then qualified at North London Polytechnic as a radio engineer. As recorded in his obituary in The Stage: "He made his skills available to his adopted country by joining the Royal Electrical and Mechanical Engineers. During the war he served in Burma and Ceylon with Radio SEAC, doubling as a disc jockey. However, before joining REME, Winston Churchill issued his order: 'Collar the lot'. Ironically, Mellinger, together with many German Jewish refugees who had fled Hitler, was classified as an enemy alien. He was taken to a detention camp at Kempton Park before being put on The Dunera for internment in Australia.... During his internment Mellinger practised, as best he could, his passion for the theatre and developed his talent as a musician. Upon his release he joined the British Army."

He subsequently trained at the Central School of Speech and Drama and in the 1950s was a member of the singing group The Harmonics. For more than 50 years he worked successfully in theatre, film, television and radio. He was a member of the Royal Shakespeare Company and Berliner Ensemble. His notable film credits include Goldfinger (1964) and Carry On Up the Khyber (1968).

Selected filmography

 Captain Horatio Hornblower R.N. (1951) - Spanish Officer (uncredited)
 South of Algiers (1953) - Spahi N.C.O
 They Who Dare (1954) - Toplis
 The Beachcomber (1954) - Medical Orderly
 Radio Cab Murder (1954) - Tim
 Stars in Your Eyes (1956) - Night Club Proprietor
 Three Crooked Men (1958) - Vince
 The Secret Man (1958) - Tony Norwood
 Man on a String (1960) - Detective
 The Password Is Courage (1962) - Feldwebel
 Siege of the Saxons (1963) - Thief (uncredited)
 Goldfinger (1964) - Kisch
 It Happened Here (1964) - Announcer (uncredited)
 Carry On Up the Khyber (1968) - Chindi
 The Assassination Bureau (1969) - Venice Police Sergeant (uncredited)
 Puppet on a Chain (1971) - Hotel Manager
 Licking Hitler (1978) - Karl
 The Awakening (1980) - Hamid
 Eye of the Needle (1981) - Portuguese Man
 Ascendancy (1983) - Schulz
 Until September (1984) - Colonel Viola
 The March (1990) - Gert Kellner
 Gladiator (2000) - Trainer 2 (extended edition)
 Charlotte Gray (2001) - Old Man Roudil
 Dirty Pretty Things (2002) - German Man
 Das Apfelbaumhaus (2004) - Albert (final film role)

References

External links

1929 births
2004 deaths
German male film actors
German male television actors
German expatriates in England
Male actors from Bavaria
Jewish German male actors
People from Bad Tölz-Wolfratshausen